Peronospora is a genus of oomycetes that are obligate plant pathogens of many eudicots. Most species in this group produce a downy mildew disease, which can cause severe damage to many different cultivated crops, as well as wild and ornamental plants. There are 19 genera that produce downy mildew, and Peronospora has been placed alongside Pseudoperonospora in the group of downy mildews with coloured conidia. Peronospora has far more species than any other genus of the downy mildews. However, many species have been moved from this genus to be reclassified to other or new genera. Among these was the most famous Peronospora species, formerly known as Peronospora parasitica, and now known as Hyaloperonospora parasitica. Now, the Peronospora species of most importance is likely the Peronospora tabacina. Peronospora tabacina causes blue mold on tobacco plants and can severely reduce yields of this economically important crop to the point where it has been classified as a bioweapon.

History
Peronospora was first described in 1837 by August Carl Joseph Corda, a Czech mycologist and physician, in his first of six volumes of his Icones fungorum hucusque cognitorum. Since then, many of the species originally placed in Peronospora have been allocated to other genera or given rise to new genera based on new techniques such as molecular genetics.

There was an epidemic in 1960 of Peronospora tabacina affecting tobacco plants leading to $25 million in losses across eleven countries, which was about 30 percent of the tobacco plants. Another epidemic that was caused by Peronospora destructor reduced the yield of sweet onions by 25 percent in Georgia, USA in 2012, and led to an estimated $18.2 million in losses.

Habitat and ecology
Most of the Peronospora species are highly specific to their hosts and can generally be found anywhere the host plant grows, or is being cultivated. A large portion of their life cycle is spent inside their host plant. Many species of Peronospora are seedborne pathogens, so the worldwide spread of Peronospora crop-plant pathogens is likely to be a result of unknowingly trading infected seeds to new areas. There are also many Peronospora species that are spread by wind currents, which allows them to disperse over large distances. Peronospora species prefer humid air and cool temperatures.

General form and structure
The first stage in the Peronospora life history is the sporangia. The sporangia are small spore-like structures about 65 um long that germinate a germ-tube when they are near a leaf stoma. A germ tube will come from the sporangium and penetrate the leaf cell where it will form a haustorium. The haustorium absorbs nutrients from the leaf, while hyphae invade the intercellular space, and the leaf will eventually develop a lesion. These lesions often start out yellow and then turn brown as the leaf starts to undergo necrosis. From here, Peronospora can undergo either asexual reproduction or sexual reproduction. Asexual reproduction occurs when the air outside is moist making for favourable conditions. During asexual reproduction, hyphae on the host plant will form sporangiophores, which will produce conidia. The conidia will be dispersed by the wind is able to infect other plants. The asexual cycle only takes five to seven days to complete. Sexual reproduction occurs when the conditions are unfavourable and it needs to withstand harsh environmental conditions. During sexual reproduction, the hyphae will undergo meiosis forming antheridia and oogonia, the only haploid structures in the Peronospora life history. The antheridia will fuse to the oogonia, initiating plasmogamy and then karyogamy, and will result in the production of many oospores. The oospores can then be dispersed by the wind to infect more plants.

Both Peronospora and Pseudoperonospora are characterized by their ability to produce melanized sporangia, but Pseudoperonospora produces zoospores whereas Peronospora cannot.

Practical importance
The model oomycete pathogen, Peronospora parasitica, used to be included in this genus, however it has been reclassified to the genus Hyaloperonospora.

Some species of Peronospora have been considered for their use as a bioweapon or have been classified as potential bioweapons. Peronspora somniferi was considered for its ability to devastate fields of the opium poppy, which could have targeted areas that depend on the crop.  The United States has classified Peronospora tabacina as a possible bioweapon, because if it were used to target the US tobacco industry, it would lead to major economic loss.

Genomics and genetics
Only one species in the genus Peronospora has had its genome sequenced and assembled. In 2015, Derevnina et al. performed a de novo sequence assembly of the genome of two Peronospora tabacina isolates using Illumina sequencing. They estimated the genome size to be 68 Mb with a mitochondrial genome of 43 kb. The two assemblies had 61.8x and 128.9x coverage for the nuclear genomes and 6,824x and 43,225x coverage for the mitochondrial genomes. The mitochondrial genome only differed by seven single nucleotide polymorphisms, three small indels, and one copy number variant. Using a program to predict gene models, they found 18,000 potential protein coding genes.

List of Peronospora species

Peronospora aconiti 
Peronospora aestivalis 
Peronospora affinis 
Peronospora agrestis 
Peronospora agrimoniae 
Peronospora alchemillae 
Peronospora alpicola 
Peronospora alsinearum 
Peronospora alta Fuckel
Peronospora akatsukae Ito & Murayama
Peronospora anagallidis 
Peronospora antirrhini 
Peronospora aparines 
Peronospora apula 
Peronospora aquatica 
Peronospora arborescens 
Peronospora arenariae 
Peronospora argemones 
Peronospora arthurii 
Peronospora arvensis 
Peronospora asperuginis 
Peronospora astragalina 
Peronospora atriplicis-hastatae 
Peronospora belbahrii 
Peronospora boni-henrici 
Peronospora bulbocapni 
Peronospora calotheca 
Peronospora campestris 
Peronospora canescens  Benua  
Peronospora cerastii-anomali 
Peronospora cerastii-brachypetali 
Peronospora chenopodii-polyspermi 
Peronospora chlorae 
Peronospora chrysosplenii 
Peronospora claytoniae 
Peronospora conglomerata 
Peronospora consolidae 
Peronospora coronillae 
Peronospora corydalis 
Peronospora corydalis-intermediae 
Peronospora cristata 
Peronospora cyparissiae 
Peronospora debaryi 
Peronospora destructor 
Peronospora dianthicola 
Peronospora dicentrae 
Peronospora digitalis 
Peronospora dipsaci 
Peronospora echii 
Peronospora effusa 
Peronospora elsholtziae 
Peronospora erodii 
Peronospora ervi 
Peronospora esulae 
Peronospora farinosa 
Peronospora farinosa f. sp. betae 
Peronospora farinosa f. sp. chenopodii 
Peronospora farinosa f. sp. spinaciae 
Peronospora ficariae 
Peronospora flava 
Peronospora fulva 
Peronospora galii 
Peronospora glechomae 
Peronospora grisea 
Peronospora hiemalis 
Peronospora holostei 
Peronospora honckenyae 
Peronospora illyrica 
Peronospora jagei 
Peronospora knautiae 
Peronospora kochiae-scopariae 
Peronospora lamii 
Peronospora lapponica 
Peronospora lathyri-verni 
Peronospora lathyrina 
Peronospora lepigoni 
Peronospora linariae 
Peronospora linariae-genistifoliae 
Peronospora lithospermi 
Peronospora litoralis 
Peronospora lotorum 
Peronospora manshurica
Peronospora mayorii
Peronospora meconopsidis
Peronospora medicaginis-minimae
Peronospora medicaginis-orbicularis
Peronospora melandryi-noctiflori
Peronospora meliloti
Peronospora mesembryanthemi
Peronospora minor
Peronospora myosotidis
Peronospora narbonensis
Peronospora oblatispora
Peronospora obovata
Peronospora ornithopi
Peronospora orobi
Peronospora parva
Peronospora paula
Peronospora perillae
Peronospora phacae
Peronospora plantaginis
Peronospora polycarpi
Peronospora polygoni
Peronospora polygoni-convolvuli
Peronospora potentillae
Peronospora potentillae-anserinae
Peronospora potentillae-reptantis
Peronospora potentillae-sterilis
Peronospora pseudostellaria
Peronospora pulveracea
Peronospora radii
Peronospora ranunculi
Peronospora aff. ranunculi
Peronospora romanica
Peronospora rubi
Peronospora rumicis
Peronospora salviae-plebeiae
Peronospora sanguisorbae
Peronospora saturejae-hortensis
Peronospora saxifragae
Peronospora schachtii
Peronospora scleranthi
Peronospora scutellariae
Peronospora sepium
Peronospora sherardiae
Peronospora silvatica
Peronospora silvestris
Peronospora somniferi
Peronospora sordida
Peronospora sparsa
Peronospora stachydis
Peronospora statices
Peronospora stellariae-aquaticae
Peronospora stellariae-uliginosae
Peronospora stigmaticola
Peronospora swinglei
Peronospora symphyti
Peronospora tabacina
Peronospora tetragonolobi
Peronospora teucrii
Peronospora tomentosa
Peronospora tranzscheliana
Peronospora trifolii-alpestris
Peronospora trifolii-arvensis
Peronospora trifolii-hybridi
Peronospora trifolii-minoris
Peronospora trifolii-repentis
Peronospora trifoliorum
Peronospora trifoliorum f. trifolii-pratensis
Peronospora trigonellae
Peronospora trigonotidis
Peronospora trivialis
Peronospora valerianae
Peronospora valerianellae
Peronospora variabilis
Peronospora verbasci
Peronospora verbenae
Peronospora verna
Peronospora vernalis
Peronospora viciae
Peronospora viciae f. sp. pisi
Peronospora violacea
Peronospora violae

References

Peronosporales
Water mould plant pathogens and diseases
Water mould genera